Catullus 51 is a poem by Roman love poet Gaius Valerius Catullus (c. 84 – c. 54 BC).  It is an adaptation of one of Sappho's fragmentary lyric poems, Sappho 31. Catullus replaces Sappho's beloved with his own beloved Lesbia. Unlike the majority of Catullus' poems, the meter of this poem is the sapphic meter. This meter is more musical, seeing as Sappho mainly sang her poetry.

Catullus is not the only poet who translated Sappho’s poem to use for himself: Pierre de Ronsard and Salvatore Quasimodo are also known to have translated a version of it.

The poem

The following Latin text of Catullus 51 is taken from D.F.S. Thomson; the translation is literal, not literary.

Catullus here builds upon a common interpretation of the lost original verse from Sappho. For a reconstruction of the original Greek first verse, see Sappho 31.
Line 8 is missing from the original manuscript. Oxford Classical Texts (ed. R.A.B. Mynors) provides no substitution.

Modern musical setting
This poem was set to music by Carl Orff as part of his Catulli Carmina (1943).

See also
 Otium
 Catullus 11

References

C051
Love poems
Adaptations of works by Sappho
Literature based on poems
Articles containing video clips